John Joseph Curran,  (February 22, 1842 – October 1, 1909) was a Canadian politician and lawyer. He was the country's first Solicitor General between December 5, 1892 and October 17, 1895 and a member of the Conservative Party between February 8, 1883 and October 17, 1895.

Life
Born in Montreal, Canada East, Curran was one of eleven children born to Charles C. and Sarah Kennedy Curran. Charles was from County Down, Ireland, and Sarah from County Wexford. John attended Collège Ste-Marie and the University of Ottawa. He graduated from McGill Law School in 1862 and was appointed to the Bar of Quebec in 1863. In 1865 he married Mary Elizabeth Brennan, with whom he had seven children. Curran was named a Queen's Counsel in 1882 and became a judge for the Superior Court of Quebec in 1885.

Curran served three terms in the Canadian House of Commons as a member for Montreal Centre. He was a professor of the law faculty and vice-dean at Ottawa University. He was Solicitor-General in 1892 to 1895, and a contributor to various periodicals, and the Catholic Encyclopedia.

References

External links
 

Judges in Quebec
Lawyers from Montreal
Anglophone Quebec people
Canadian non-fiction writers
Canadian people of Irish descent
Conservative Party of Canada (1867–1942) MPs
Members of the House of Commons of Canada from Quebec
Members of the King's Privy Council for Canada
Politicians from Montreal
Writers from Montreal
1842 births
1909 deaths
Solicitors General of Canada
McGill University Faculty of Law alumni
Contributors to the Catholic Encyclopedia
Place of death missing
Canadian King's Counsel